David Custis Meade (21 August 1940 – 9 October 2019) was a major general in the United States Army who served as commanding officer of the 10th Mountain Division from August 1993 to July 1995. As division commander, he also served as commander of Multinational Forces Haiti from October 1994 to January 1995.

Early life and education
Born in Washington, D.C. and raised in Bethesda, Maryland, Meade graduated from Bethesda-Chevy Chase Senior High School in 1958. He then attended Dickinson College, where he was a member of Beta Theta Pi, played lacrosse and earned an A.B. degree in 1962. Meade participated in the Army ROTC program at Dickinson College and was commissioned a second lieutenant of artillery upon graduation. He later received a master's degree in education from the University of Virginia.

Military career
During his career, Meade was deployed to Vietnam, Somalia, Haiti, Grenada and Panama.

As a lieutenant colonel, Meade served as commander of the 1st Battalion, 79th Field Artillery Regiment. As a colonel, he was given command of the 7th Infantry Division Artillery.

As a major general, Meade supervised the deployment of 10th Mountain Division troops to Haiti in 1994 during Operation Uphold Democracy.

In May 1995, Meade was conferred an honorary Doctor of Liberal Arts degree by his alma mater Dickinson College. He retired from active duty later in 1995.

Awards and decorations
Meade's military awards included:

Personal
Meade was the son of Custis Grymes Meade (1910–2004) and Lilla Capers (Lyman) Meade (1909–1999). His parents were married in 1934 and he had one brother.

Meade was married to Frances Meade. They had a daughter, two sons and six grandchildren. After his first marriage ended in divorce, he remarried with Marina (Kalergis) Meade.

After his death in Dover, New Hampshire, Meade was interred at Arlington National Cemetery on 28 July 2020.

References

1940 births
2019 deaths
People from Washington, D.C.
Bethesda-Chevy Chase High School alumni
Dickinson College alumni
United States Army personnel of the Vietnam War
Recipients of the Air Medal
Curry School of Education alumni
Recipients of the Meritorious Service Medal (United States)
Recipients of the Legion of Merit
United States Army generals
Recipients of the Distinguished Service Medal (US Army)
Recipients of the Defense Distinguished Service Medal
Burials at Arlington National Cemetery
Recipients of the Order of Military Merit (Brazil)